Philodromus pinetorum is a spider species found from Portugal to Turkey.

See also 
 List of Philodromidae species

References

External links 

pinetorum
Spiders of Europe
Fauna of Portugal
Spiders of Asia
Arthropods of Turkey
Spiders described in 2009